Bombay Rockers is a Danish-Indian band, popular in India. Their debut album Introducing has gone five times platinum with sales of over 100,000 albums.

Biography
In 2002, the Indian singer Navtej Singh Rehal (Naf) was introduced to the Scandinavian producer-team WCA (Thomas Sardorf and Janus Barnewitz) and started out mixing a hybrid of R&B, Hip Hop and Bhangra-influenced vocals, reflecting on their varied cultural backgrounds. Naf, 27, delivers the Punjabi vocals. Thomas, also 27, performs with English vocals.

Their first collaboration, "Ari Ari", got massive national airplay in Denmark and became a favourite of left field DJs. In July 2003, Bombay Rockers went on stage with the house duo Filur at Roskilde Festival in front of roughly 25,000 people.  A month later they were performing in the "Images of Asia" festival, as well as playing numerous concerts in Copenhagen and the rest of Denmark. In February 2003, they performed with the famous English DJ project Panjabi MC.

“Sexy Mama”, their follow-up, released in late 2003, was the first official single from their album Introducing. This track again received airplay all over the country. The next hit single “Rock tha Party” became a major radio hit. Danish national radio had it on A-rotation, it was on top of the Danish Dance Chart and the Danish Single Chart. It was published on various compilations released in Denmark throughout 2004. While their third single and video for "Wild Rose" (shot in Dubai) and debut album Introducing... was promoted in Denmark. Bombay Rockers' debut album was released in more than 32 countries worldwide in 2005. In Germany "Sexy Mama" was released in mid-2005 and is getting a lot of airplay and buzz.

Also in 2005, they supported some of Irish pop vocal band Westlife's The No 1's concert tour dates

The Rockers are currently enjoying great success in India and Pakistan. Their album has sold more than 100,000 copies and has now gone five times platinum. It was #1 for 15 consecutive weeks on the Indian Album Charts. They were also the supporting act for the popband Westlife at gigs in Dubai and Bahrain.

The album Crash and Burn was released in 2007. "Kushi", one of the singles, has received a lot of play time on Indian and Pakistani music channels as well as in Sri-Lanka.

The new album "Rock and Dhol" was released worldwide on iTunes on March 21  and the CD released in India on March 29, 2011. The album consists of 12 tracks and again puts a lot of influence on the hybrid of R&B and Bhangra. The album is getting really positive reviews and the singles "Lets Dance", "Nava Nava" and "Ishq" are already proving immensely popular with the masses and are getting a great deal of airplay on the Indo-Pak radio circuit. Response in Denmark has also been good. Bombay rockers is currently touring all over the world.

Prior to the release of the album the band had reemerged on the music scene after a two year break with music video release of the single "Lets Dance".

They are working on new tracks and some collaborations across the country. Currently they are working on upcoming Bollywood projects. They sang and gave the music for the song 	"Rock Tha Party"  for the film Rocky Handsome.

Stage shows
 JIVE 2009, Jaypee institute of information technology (JIIT), Noida. Invited by the president of JIIT Youth Club's Abhinav Shrivastava.
 COLOSSEUM 2010 College of Technology, Pantnagar G. B. Pant University of Agriculture and Technology
 Vivum Twelve, The International School Bangalore, in Whitefield, Bengaluru.
 Pratibimb 2012, Veermata Jijabai Technological Institute, Mumbai
 G-Quasar 2013, Galgotias University, Greater Noida.
 Cognizance 2014, IIT Roorkee, Roorkee.

Discography

Studio albums
Introducing... (2005)
Crash and Burn (2007)
All or Nothing feat. Bombay Rockers (Overseas album) (2008)
Rock and Dhol (2011)

Remix albums
Rock Tha Party & Sexy Mama (2004)

Singles
"Sexy Mamaa" (2003)
"Wild Rose" (2005)
"Out of Control" (2006)
"Kushi" (2007)
"Beautiful" (2007)
"Nach Lay feat. Bombay Rockers" (2008)
"Let's Dance" (2011)

References

External links

Danish rock music groups
Musical groups established in 2002